Buin-e Sofla (also Romanized as Būʼīn-e Soflá, Būyen-e Soflá, and Būyen Soflá - all meaning "Lower Buin"; also known as Būyen-e Pāʼīn with similar meaning; also, simply Būyen) is a city and capital of Nanur District, in Baneh County, Kurdistan Province, Iran. At the 2011, its population was 4,524, in 977 families. The city is populated by Kurds.

References

Towns and villages in Baneh County
Cities in Kurdistan Province
Kurdish settlements in Kurdistan Province